The Zhi-Yan dialect is a dialect of Jin Chinese spoken within much of Yan'an, Shaanxi, China. The dialect is spoken throughout Baota District, Zhidan County, and Yanchuan County.

Located in a transition zone between the Jin Chinese of northern Shaanxi and Guanzhong, the Zhi-Yan dialect shows some transitional characteristics in both tones and vocabulary. With the exception of the checked tone, the tones between the Zhi-Yan dialect and the nearby  are the same. Among ancient checked tone syllables, only fully voiced consonants still retain the checked tone, while clear and sub-voiced syllables are spoken with a high tone. Most tones are similar to those spoken in Guanzhong. The Zhi-Yan dialect retains checked tones found in northern Shaanxi Jin, but not the checked tones found in Central Plains Mandarin.

The Zhi-Yan dialect was heavily influences by a mass migration of people from nearby Yulin, who moved to Yan'an en masse in the 1930s after a famine struck Yulin. As such, Zhi-Yan speakers descended from those who migrated from Yulin retain characteristics not found in other Zhi-Yan speakers, who share more characteristics with people from Guanzhong.

The Zhi-Yan dialect is spoken in Baota District, Zhidan County and Yanchuan County.

References 
Jin Chinese
Yan'an
Zhidan County

Baota District